Aberdeen Airport is an airport in Aberdeen, Scotland.

Aberdeen Airport may also refer to:
 Aberdeen Municipal Airport in Aberdeen, Idaho, United States
 Aberdeen Regional Airport in Aberdeen, South Dakota, United States

See also 
 Aberdeen (disambiguation)